Oleg Ivanovich Kravchenko 'Олег Иванович Кравченко' (1971 – 25 December 2020) was a Belarusian diplomat. From 2017 to 2020, he served as Deputy Minister of Foreign Affairs, before being appointed Ambassador of Belarus to the United States in 2020, where he served till his death.

Kravchenko died on 25 December 2020, aged 50, in Minsk from COVID-19.

References

1971 births
2020 deaths
Deaths from the COVID-19 pandemic in Belarus
Diplomats from Minsk
Ambassadors of Belarus to the United States